The 2010 Mid-Ohio Sports Car Challenge was the sixth round of the 2010 American Le Mans Series season. It took place at Mid-Ohio Sports Car Course on August 7, 2010. The Muscle Milk Team Cytosport Porsche did not start the race after Greg Pickett destroyed the car during testing on the Thursday before the race.

Qualifying

Qualifying result
Pole position winners in each class are marked in bold.

Race

Race result
Class winners in bold.  Cars failing to complete 70% of their class winner's distance are marked as Not Classified (NC).

References

Sports Car Challenge of Mid-Ohio
Mid-Ohio
2010 in sports in Ohio